is a 1993 platform game developed by Sega for the Sega CD. As Sonic the Hedgehog, the player attempts to protect an extraterrestrial body, Little Planet, from Doctor Robotnik. Like other Sonic games, Sonic runs through themed levels while collecting rings and defeating robots. Sonic CD introduces time travel as a game mechanic. By traveling through time, players can access different versions of stages, featuring alternative layouts, music, and graphics.

Sonic CD began as a port of the Sega Genesis game Sonic the Hedgehog (1991) to the Sega CD, but developed into a separate project. Led by Sonic co-creator Naoto Ohshima, the developers sought to show off the technical capabilities of the Sega CD. Sonic CD features the debuts of the recurring Sonic characters Amy Rose and Metal Sonic, and includes animated cutscenes. Two soundtracks were composed: the one featured in the Japanese and European versions was composed by Naofumi Hataya and Masafumi Ogata, while the one in the North American version was composed by Spencer Nilsen, David Young, and Mark Crew.

Sonic CD was released in late 1993. It received critical acclaim and is often called one of the best Sonic and platform games. Reviewers praised its size, music, and time travel feature, although some felt it did not fully use the Sega CD's capabilities. It sold over 1.5 million copies, making it the bestselling Sega CD game. Sonic CD was ported to Windows as part of the Sega PC brand in 1996, and to the PlayStation 2 and GameCube as part of Sonic Gems Collection in 2005. A remake, developed by Christian Whitehead using the Retro Engine, was released for various platforms in 2011 and rereleased as part of the Sonic Origins compilation in 2022.

Gameplay 

Sonic CD is a side-scrolling platform game similar to the original Sonic the Hedgehog. Players control Sonic the Hedgehog as he ventures to stop his nemesis Doctor Robotnik from obtaining the magical Time Stones and conquering a Little Planet. Like previous games, Sonic can destroy enemies and objects (such as certain walls and television monitors containing power-ups) by rolling into a ball, and collects rings as a form of health. Sonic can also perform a "spin dash" and a "super peel-out", both of which increase his speed. The game has seven levels. In the first and second games, the levels were named zones, but in this game, they're named rounds, the previously-named acts now named zones instead. Each round is split into three zones, the third of which ends in a boss fight against Robotnik. Players start with three lives, which are lost when they suffer any type of damage without rings in their possession; losing all lives results in a game over.

Sonic CD is differentiated from other Sonic games through its time travel game mechanic, which allows players to access different versions of rounds set in the past, present and future. The music changes within the different time zones, as remixes of the present music. Sonic starts the first two zones in the present. The third zone is always set in the future, its timeline dependent upon whether the player destroyed both transporters. He travels through time by hitting signs labelled "past" or "future", maintaining his speed afterward. By default, future stages are neglected and littered with machinery after Robotnik has conquered the Little Planet, appropriately named "bad futures." Players are encouraged to convert each zone into a "good future", with bright colors, thriving nature, and few enemies. To achieve a good future in each zone, players must travel to the past and destroy a hidden transporter where enemy robots spawn. Achieving a good future in every zone unlocks the game's best ending.

By finishing a level with more than 50 rings, Sonic can access a special stage, in which he must destroy six UFOs in a pseudo-3D environment within a time limit. Time is reduced swiftly if the player runs through water, though a special UFO which appears when time is running out grants extra time if destroyed. If the player destroys all the UFOs before the time runs out, they earn a Time Stone. Collecting all seven Time Stones automatically creates a good future in every zone, unlocking the best ending. The game also features a time attack mode, where players can replay completed levels for the fastest time possible; a "D.A. Garden", where players can listen to the music of completed zones; and a "Visual Mode", where players can view the opening and closing animations. The game also includes a save feature, which uses the back-up memory of the Sega CD.

Plot
Some time after his first adventure, Sonic CD opens with Sonic rushing to Never Lake, where an extraterrestrial body, Little Planet, appears in the last month of every year. His nemesis, Dr. Robotnik, has chained the planet to a mountain and begun transforming it into a giant fortress with his robot army. To execute his plan, Robotnik uses the Time Stones, seven diamonds which controls the flow of time, hidden in the different zones. Sonic ventures into the planet, followed by the besotted Amy Rose, his self-proclaimed girlfriend. Robotnik dispatches his newest invention, Metal Sonic, to kidnap Amy at Collision Chaos, luring Sonic into danger.

After outrunning Metal Sonic in Stardust Speedway and saving Amy, Sonic fights and defeats Robotnik in his lair, Metallic Madness. Two endings exist, depending on whether or not the player collected the Time Stones or achieved a good future in each level. In the good ending, Little Planet thanks Sonic with a shower of stars and leaves Never Lake; in the bad ending, Little Planet still leaves, but Robotnik uses the Time Stones to bring it back and the player is urged to replay the game to achieve the good ending.

Development

Background and conception

The original Sonic the Hedgehog (1991) was developed by Sonic Team at Sega. It was a major commercial success and positioned Sega as Nintendo's main rival in the console market. The lead programmer, Yuji Naka, dissatisfied with Sega of Japan's rigid corporate policies, moved with several members of Sonic Team to the United States to develop Sonic the Hedgehog 2 with Sega Technical Institute (STI). Meanwhile, Sega planned to release the Sega CD add-on for its Genesis, and wanted a Sonic game that would demonstrate its more advanced features. Naoto Ohshima, the designer of Sonic, was Sonic CDs director; the remainder of the team comprised Sega staff who had developed The Revenge of Shinobi, Golden Axe 2, and Streets of Rage. The team built Sonic CD using the original Sonic the Hedgehog code as a base.

Sonic CD was conceived as an enhanced port of Sonic the Hedgehog for the Sega CD, but it gradually developed into a separate project. It was titled CD Sonic the Hedgehog first before being renamed Sonic CD. Ohshima does not consider Sonic CD a sequel to Sonic the Hedgehog or Sonic 2, although the artist Yasushi Yamaguchi said its story may be set between the two.

Design
Sonic the Hedgehog had a balance on speed and platforming; STI built on the speed with Sonic 2s more focused level designs. However, Ohshima's team sought to focus on the platforming and exploration aspects. Ohshima said, "our ideas were to make the world and setting larger, and to add more replayability, so it would be something you could enjoy playing for a long time". According to artist Kazuyuki Hoshino, because it was a Sega CD game, the team wanted Sonic CD to stand out compared to previous Sonic games. Visually, the game was designed to resemble CG imagery; the Sonic sprite on the title screen was based on a Sonic figurine by Taku Makino that the team photographed and scanned.

Sonic CD marks the debuts of Amy Rose and Metal Sonic, both designed by Hoshino. Although Hoshino created Amy's in-game graphics, many staff members contributed ideas to her design. Her headband and trainer shoes reflected Ohshima's tastes while her mannerisms reflected the traits Hoshino looked for in women at the time. Hoshino designed Metal Sonic in response to Ohshima wanting a strong rival for Sonic. Hoshino had a clear image of Metal Sonic in his mind from the moment he was briefed, and his design emerged after only a few sketches. The character graphics were created using Sega's proprietary graphics system for the Genesis, the "Sega Digitizer MK-III", featuring a bitmap and animation editor. The team mostly used Macintosh IIcis. Graphics data was stored on 3.5-inch floppy disks, which were handed to the programmer to work into the game. Though Naka was not directly involved with Sonic CD, he exchanged design ideas with Ohshima.

Ohshima cited the film Back to the Future (1985) as an influence on the time travel. The developers designed four variants of each stage (one for each time period). Ohshima hoped for the time period to change instantly with a "sonic boom" effect, but the programmers argued this was impossible and produced a loading sequence instead. Sega did not pressure the team developing Sonic CD as much as the one developing Sonic 2. Ohshima felt this was because Sonic CD is not a numbered sequel; he considered it a recreation of the original game. The total game data of Sonic CD is 21 megabytes (MB), compared to Sonic 2s 1 MB. The game includes animated cutscenes produced by Studio Junio; the team used a format that provided uncompressed imagery to the video display processor, which allowed for superior results in contrast to the Cinepak compression used for other Sega CD games. The special stages feature Mode 7-like background plane manipulation effects. Time constraints led to one of the levels being cut.

Music
The Japanese soundtrack was composed by Naofumi Hataya and Masafumi Ogata, who had worked together on the 8-bit version of Sonic the Hedgehog 2. The game features two songs: "Sonic - You Can Do Anything", often referred to as "Toot Toot Sonic Warrior", composed by Ogata and originally written for Sonic the Hedgehog 2, and "Cosmic Eternity - Believe in Yourself", composed by Hataya. Both are sung by Keiko Utoku. The composition team drew inspiration from club music, such as house and techno, while Hataya cited C+C Music Factory, Frankie Knuckles, and the KLF as influences.

Sega of America delayed the North American release of Sonic CD for two months to have a new soundtrack written and produced by Spencer Nilsen and David Young of Sega Multimedia Studio, with select tracks written and produced by former Santana keyboardist Mark "Sterling" Crew. Crew's tracks feature fellow Santana member Armando Peraza as percussionist. According to Nilsen, Sega's American marketing division believed it needed a more "rich and complex" soundtrack and a theme song they could use to promote it. The tracks in the "Past" stages could not be replaced as they were sequenced PCM audio tracks rather than streamed Mixed Mode CD audio. "You Can Do Anything" was replaced with "Sonic Boom", composed by Nilsen and performed by the female vocal group Pastiche.

Release
Sonic CD was released in Japan on September 23, 1993, and Europe in October 1993. After being delayed for the new soundtrack, it was released in North America in November 1993. Sonic CD was the flagship Sega CD game and the system's only Sonic game. An enhanced version of the original Sonic the Hedgehog and a Sonic-themed localization of Popful Mail were canceled.

Rereleases 

Two versions of Sonic CD were released for Windows: one in 1995 for Pentium processors, and another in 1996 for DirectX. The Pentium version was only bundled with new computers and never sold in stores; Sega worked with Intel to make the game work properly. The DirectX version was released under the Sega PC brand and distributed by SoftKey in North America on July 8 and in Japan on August 9. This version is mostly identical to the original release, but loading screens were added and it is only compatible with older versions of Windows. Both Windows versions use the North American soundtrack.

The 1996 Windows version was ported to the GameCube and PlayStation 2 in August 2005 for Sonic Gems Collection. This port uses the original soundtrack in Japan and the North American soundtrack elsewhere. The ports introduced some graphical problems, such as a blurry anti-flicker presentation, but the opening animation is presented in a higher quality fullscreen view.

In 2009, independent programmer Christian Whitehead produced a proof-of-concept video of a remastered version of the game, using his Retro Engine, running on iOS. Sega released this version in 2011 for Xbox 360, PlayStation 3, iOS, Android, and PC, with assistance from BlitWorks in the PC and console ports. The remaster features enhancements such as widescreen graphics, fine-tuned collision detection to make time traveling more consistent, refined visuals and frame rate for Special Stages, the option for spin dash physics from Sonic the Hedgehog 2, both the Japanese and North American soundtracks, the ability to unlock Tails as a playable character, and achievement and trophy support. Whitehead designed two original stages, but they were excluded as Sega wanted to keep the game faithful to the original release. The remaster was not released on the Wii as it exceeded the WiiWare download size. It was included in the 2022 compilation Sonic Origins, which removed voice lines for Sonic and Amy.

Reception

The Sega CD version sold more than 1.5 million copies, making it the system's best-seller. In the United Kingdom, it was the top-selling Mega CD game in December 1993.

The game received critical acclaim. The presentation, visuals, and audio were praised. Computer and Video Games wrote that, although Sonic CD did not use the Sega CD's capabilities to its fullest, the game's graphics and sound were still excellent, calling the music "from the likes of 2Unlimited and Bizarre Inc". Electronic Games said that the game looked similar to older games and used the Sega CD's special features minimally, but this did not detract from the quality. The music was singled out as making Sonic CD "stand above the crowd"; the reviewer wrote that it helped add richness to the game. The reviewers of Electronic Gaming Monthly (EGM) praised the game's animated cinematics and sound, but noted frame rate drops during special stages. Retrospective opinions of the presentation have also been positive. IGN praised its vibrant colors and felt the game looked nice, and GamesRadar thought its music stood the test of time, writing: "What must've dated very quickly in the 1990s is somehow totally fresh today".

Critics were divided over the change of soundtrack in the North American versions. GameFan, which had given the Japanese version of Sonic CD a score of 100%, lambasted the change. GameFan editor Dave Halverson called the change "an atrocity that remains the biggest injustice in localization history". The reviewer for GamesRadar said he shut his GameCube off in disgust when he realized Sonic Gems Collection used the American soundtrack. In a 2008 interview, Nilsen said "I think critics were looking for a way to bash the game... it was like we replaced the music for Star Wars after the movie had been out for a while."

The gameplay was also widely praised. EGM admired the diverse levels and felt the time travel added depth. Electronic Games wrote that Sonic CD played as well as previous Sonic games, and that the time travel—coupled with large levels rich with secrets and Super Mario Kart-like special stages—added replayability. Sega Pro also noted the expanded environments and the replay value travel added by the time travel, writing that "the more you play Sonic CD the better it gets", but felt the game was too easy. In its debut issue, Sega Magazine said Sonic CD was "potentially a classic". GameSpot singled out the "interesting level design and the time-travelling gameplay" as a major selling point, saying it provided a unique take on the classic Sonic formula.

Critics wrote that Sonic CD was one of the best Sega CD games. Electronic Games called it a must-have, and Sega Pro said it was "brilliant", imaginative and worth more than its price. Destructoid described it as "a hallmark of excellence", creative, strange, and exciting, and said that "to miss Sonic CD would be to miss some of the franchise's best".

Reception to later versions of Sonic CD varied. GameSpot considered the 1996 Windows version inferior, criticizing its technical performance and "tedious and monotonous" gameplay. The reviewer wrote that "those who have played Sonic on a Sega game system will find nothing new here" and that it was not worth its $50 price. Reviews of the version in Sonic Gems Collection were favorable. IGN remembered Sonic CD as one of the best things about the Sega CD and called it a standout for the compilation, and a major selling point. Eurogamer wrote: "Rejoice for Sonic CD... Just don't rejoice for anything else [in Sonic Gems Collection], because it's mostly rubbish." According to Metacritic, the 2011 console version received "generally favorable reviews", while the iOS version received "universal acclaim". Sonic CD is frequently named among the best Sonic games and platform games. In 1997, EGM named it the 17th best console game of all time, citing the bonus levels and animated intro.

Legacy
The story of Sonic CD was adapted in the twenty-fifth issue of Archie Comics' Sonic the Hedgehog comic book series. The adaptation featured some changes to the story, such as Tails being an important character and Metal Sonic having the ability to talk. British publisher Fleetway Publications published their own adaptation in Sonic the Comic. The final issue of Archie's comic, #290 (December 2016), also featured a retelling of the game's story.

Two characters introduced in the game, Amy Rose and Metal Sonic, became recurring characters in the Sonic series. Metal Sonic appeared as a major antagonist in Knuckles' Chaotix (1995), the Sonic the Hedgehog Anime movie (1996),  Sonic Heroes (2003), Sonic the Hedgehog 4: Episode II (2012) and Sonic Mania (2017). Amy Rose most notably appears in Sonic Adventure. The Sonic CD animated sequences were included as bonuses in the compilation Sonic Jam (1997), and "Sonic Boom" was used as one of Sonic's themes in Super Smash Bros. Brawl (2008).

In 2011, for the Sonic franchise's 20th anniversary, Sega released Sonic Generations, which includes remakes of various Sonic stages. Both versions feature a re-imagined version of the boss battle against Metal Sonic. Sonic Mania, produced for the series' twenty-fifth anniversary, features updated versions of Sonic CDs Metallic Madness and Stardust Speedway levels, including a boss battle against Metal Sonic.

Notes

References

External links 
Official website
Sonic CD at MobyGames

1993 video games
Android (operating system) games
Interquel video games
IOS games
PlayStation Network games
Sega CD games
Side-scrolling video games
Side-scrolling platform games
Sonic the Hedgehog video games
Video games about time travel
Video games developed in Japan
Xbox Live Arcade games
Windows games
Video games with alternate endings
Video games set on fictional planets
Single-player video games
Video games scored by David Young
Video games scored by Naofumi Hataya
Video games scored by Spencer Nilsen